The West Side Historic District in Carson City, Nevada, United States, is a historic district that was listed on the National Register of Historic Places in 2011.  It includes properties within an area roughly bounded by Curry, Mountain, 5th & John Sts.

References 

National Register of Historic Places in Carson City, Nevada
Historic districts on the National Register of Historic Places in Nevada